James Carl Vellone  (August 20, 1944 - August 21, 1977) was a guard in the National Football League. Vellone spent his entire five-year career for the Minnesota Vikings, starting in most of his appearances during this span. Vellone helped the Vikings win the 1969 NFL Championship and also started in Super Bowl IV, the first Super Bowl appearance for the Vikings franchise. Vellone's career and life were cut short due to Hodgkin's lymphoma.

College career
Before he joined the pro leagues, Vellone played college football for two years at the University of Southern California. Prior to joining the USC Trojans, Vellone was a Junior College All-American guard at Cerritos College. For two seasons while in Minnesota (1968–1969), Vellone was a teammate of offensive tackle Ron Yary, who likewise was a star lineman at Cerritos College and at USC.

Death
Jim Vellone abruptly retired from the NFL in 1971 when he discovered he had Hodgkin's lymphoma. He spent the final six years of his life undergoing treatments and chemotherapy. Although managing to live a normal life for some time, Vellone finally succumbed to the cancerous disease on August 21, 1977, a day after his 33rd birthday, at St. Joseph's Hospital in Orange, California. According to a brief article in the St. Petersburg Times (Fla.) newspaper two days after his death, friends said that Vellone checked into St. Joseph's, due to breathing problems.

Jim Vellone left behind two sons Eric and John, brother Louis, and parents

Other
Jim's high school alma mater named their Athlete of the Year award after him. The award's recipients included Greg Langford (Wrestling, 1972), Paul Phillips (Swimming, 1973), and Bill Qualls (Cross Country and Track, 1974).

References

External links
Pro Football Reference: Jim Vellone

1944 births
1977 deaths
Cerritos Falcons football players
Minnesota Vikings players
USC Trojans football players
American football offensive guards
People from Jacksonville, North Carolina
Deaths from Hodgkin lymphoma
Deaths from cancer in California